Herbert Hastings Sharp (23 July 1881 – 1 September 1918) was an English-born New Zealand first-class cricketer and New Zealand Army soldier.

The son of Hastings Sharp, he was born in July 1881 at Blackheath, Kent. He was educated at St. Lawrence College, Ramsgate. Sharp immigrated to New Zealand around 1901, where he gained employment with a Mr. Carlyon. He was a cricket enthusiast, playing club cricket in Poverty Bay. Sharp appeared once in first-class cricket, playing for Hawke's Bay against Auckland at Auckland Domain in 1905. In a heavy defeat for Hawke's Bay, he made scores of 13 and 1, being dismissed by Jocelyn Kallender and William Stemson respectively.

Sharp served in the First World War, seeing action on the Western Front in the New Zealand Expeditionary Force as a corporal with the 26th Reinforcements. He was killed in action on 1 September 1918 near Bancourt during the Second Battle of Bapaume. He is buried at the Bancourt British Cemetery.

References

External links

1881 births
1918 deaths
Burials in France
Military personnel from Kent
People from Blackheath, London
People educated at St Lawrence College, Ramsgate
English emigrants to New Zealand
New Zealand cricketers
Hawke's Bay cricketers
New Zealand Army soldiers
New Zealand Military Forces personnel of World War I
New Zealand military personnel killed in World War I